Iker Bachiller Vega (born 14 September 2002) is a Spanish footballer who plays for AD Alcorcón B as a left back.

Club career
Born in Madrid, Bachiller joined Atlético Madrid's youth setup in 2009, aged six. In August 2021, after finishing his formation, he moved to AD Alcorcón and was assigned to the reserves in Tercera División RFEF.

Bachiller made his senior debut on 12 September 2021, starting in a 0–3 away loss against CF Fuenlabrada Promesas Madrid 2021. He made his first team debut on 24 October, coming on as a second-half substitute for Juan Aguilera in a 0–3 loss at UD Las Palmas in the Segunda División championship.

References

External links
AD Alcorcón profile 

2002 births
Living people
Footballers from Madrid
Spanish footballers
Association football defenders
Segunda División players
Tercera Federación players
AD Alcorcón B players
AD Alcorcón footballers